Nani Gopal Mandal is a Bangladesh Awami League politician and a former member of parliament from Khulna-1.

Career
Mandal was elected to Parliament from Khulna-1 as a Bangladesh Awami League candidate in 2008. He contested the January 5, 2014 election as an independent candidate after failing to get the nomination from Bangladesh Awami League.

Controversy
Mandal was accused of assaulting Joyonti Rani, vice chairwoman of Dkope upazila. His actions were condemned by the Upazila Parishad Association of Bangladesh. On May 4, 2012, an arrest warrant was issued against him by the Senior Judicial Magistrate's Court (Ga zone).

References

Awami League politicians
Living people
9th Jatiya Sangsad members
Bangladeshi Hindus
Year of birth missing (living people)